Max Niederlag (born 5 May 1993) is a German track cyclist. He won at the 2012 UEC European Track Championships the silver medal in the sprint. He won three years later the bronze medal in the team sprint at the 2015 UEC European Track Championships in Grenchen, Switzerland. He participated at the 2014 UCI Track Cycling World Championships in the sprint.

References

1993 births
German male cyclists
Living people
Place of birth missing (living people)
German track cyclists
Cyclists from Saxony
People from Sächsische Schweiz-Osterzgebirge